Joe Sheerin (born 1 February 1979 in Hammersmith, London) is an English former professional footballer who played in the Premier League for Chelsea and in the Football League for AFC Bournemouth.

Career
Sheerin began his career as a trainee with Chelsea, turning professional in August 1996. He made his league debut, as a last minute substitute for Gianfranco Zola in the 1–0 win away to Wimbledon on 22 April 1997. The game ended within a minute of his entering play, and it turned out to be his only appearance for Chelsea, giving him the record for the shortest Premier League career.

He left Chelsea in February 2000, joining AFC Bournemouth, and scored a spectacular hooked goal on his home debut against Oldham Athletic. He left Dean Court by mutual consent in October 2000, joining non-league Kingstonian. In the summer of 2002 Sheerin attended trials for AFC Wimbledon and was made captain of the newly formed side. He became a firm favourite with the fans as the Dons rose through the non-league pyramid. He left in June 2005, after scoring 35 times in 85 first team appearances, joining Croydon Athletic. He left Croydon in December 2005, briefly returning to AFC Wimbledon, before moving on to Leatherhead in 2006. 

He was sent off in the preliminary round of the FA Cup against Dartford on 1 September 2007 for throwing a punch. Leatherhead went on to lose the game 3–0.

References

1979 births
Living people
Footballers from Hammersmith
English footballers
Premier League players
Chelsea F.C. players
AFC Bournemouth players
Kingstonian F.C. players
AFC Wimbledon players
Leatherhead F.C. players
Croydon Athletic F.C. players
Association football forwards